1921 Polish Football Championship was the 2nd edition of the Polish Football Championship (Non-League) and 1st completed season ended with the selection of a winner. The championship was decided in final tournament played among five teams (winners of the regional A-Class championship). The champions were Cracovia, who won their 1st Polish title.

Competition modus
The final tournament started on 21 August 1921 and concluded on 30 October 1921 (spring-autumn system). The season was played as a round-robin tournament. The team at the top of the standings won the title. A total of 5 teams participated. Each team played a total of 8 matches, half at home and half away, two games against each other team. Teams received two points for a win and one point for a draw.

Teams
Note: Table lists in alphabetical order.

Final tournament table

Top goalscorers

Medal squads(Tournament appearances and goals listed in brackets)''

References

Bibliography

External links
 Poland – List of final tables at RSSSF 
 List of Polish football championships 
 List of Polish football championships 

Polish Football Championship, 1921
Polish Football Championship, 1921
Polish
Polish
Seasons in Polish football competitions